Helena Floriana Kurnatowska (born 17 February 1929) is a Polish politician who served as a Member of Sejm from 1976 to 1985.

Early life and education
Helena Floriana Kurnatowska was born on 17 February 1929 in Lille, France. She studied chemical engineering at the Wroclaw University of Technology.

Political career
From 1976, she was a Regional Councillor on the National Council in Katowice and was a Director in the Office of Design and Paint Plastics Industry "PROERG" in Gliwice. In 1976 she was elected as a Member of the Sejm. She stood as a candidate in Gliwice district on behalf of the Polish United Workers' Party. In 1980, she was re-elected.  She served on the Committee on Mines, Energy and Chemistry; the Committee of Labour and Social Affairs; and the Committee on Industry.

Awards and honors

 Order of Polonia Restituta
 Cross of Merit
 Medal of Merit for National Defence

External links
 Parliamentary Profile

1929 births
Living people
People from Lille
French people of Polish descent
Clan of Łodzia
Polish Workers' Party politicians
Polish United Workers' Party members
Members of the Polish Sejm 1976–1980
Members of the Polish Sejm 1980–1985
Women members of the Sejm of the Polish People's Republic
Wrocław University of Technology alumni
Recipients of the Cross of Merit (Poland)